Julien Durand may refer to:

 Julien Durand (footballer) (born 1983), French association footballer
 Julien Durand (politician) (1874–1973), French politician